Ulrich Thein (7 April 1930 – 21 June 1995) was a German actor, film director and screenwriter. He appeared in more than 40 films and television shows between 1953 and 1995. He won the award for Best Actor at the 11th Moscow International Film Festival in 1979 for his role in Anton the Magician. He directed the 1982 film Romance with Amelie, which was entered into the 32nd Berlin International Film Festival.

Selected filmography

 Alarm in the Circus (1954)
 Thomas Müntzer (1956)
 A Berlin Romance (1956)
 Schlösser und Katen (1957)
 The Sailor's Song (1958)
 SAS 181 antwortet nicht (1959)
 Professor Mamlock (1961)
 September Love (1961)
 Star-Crossed Lovers (1962)
 The Story of a Murder (1965)
 Anton the Magician (1978)
 Romance with Amelie (1982)
 Johann Sebastian Bach (1985, TV series)

Bibliography
 Andy Räder: "Poesie des Alltäglichen. Ulrich Theins Regiearbeiten für das Fernsehen der DDR (1963‐1976)". Springer Nature, Wiesbaden 2019. .

References

External links

1930 births
1995 deaths
German male film actors
Actors from Braunschweig
Mass media people from Braunschweig
Recipients of the Art Prize of the German Democratic Republic
20th-century German male actors